Anneli Elisabeth Alhanko Skoglund (born 11 December 1953 in Bogotá, Colombia) is a Swedish ballet dancer and actress. She is the daughter of the Finnish consul Erkki Alhanko, who was stationed in Colombia when she was born.

From 1971 to 1997 she was employed by the Royal Swedish Ballet in Stockholm, Sweden. She became one of the ballet company's premier prima ballerinas. She is one of twelve in the world with the title prima ballerina assoluta.

Alhanko is also one of the founders of the dance school Base 23 which opened in Stockholm January 2010.

Anneli Alhanko is aunt to the actress Josephine Alhanko, Miss Sweden 2006.

Appearances in films
 1984 - Abbalett
 1993 - Sista dansen
 1994 - Dansaren
 2000 - The Working of Utopia
 2002 - R.E.A. (Roligt. Elakt. Aktuellt.)

Footnotes

References

External links
  
  

1953 births
Living people
Actresses from Bogotá
Swedish film actresses
Swedish ballerinas
Swedish people of Finnish descent
20th-century Swedish ballet dancers
Royal Swedish Ballet dancers